In New Zealand, native schools were established to provide education for Māori. The first schools for Māori children  were established by the Church Missionary Society (CMS) in the Bay of Islands after the arrival of the CMS in 1814. Bishop Pompallier arrived in 1838. Priests and brothers of the Marist order, established schools for the Māori throughout the country, including Hato Paora College (Feilding) and Hato Petera College (Auckland). St Joseph's Māori Girls' College (Taradale)  was founded by the Sisters of Our Lady of the Missions.

The Native Schools Act 1867 established a national system of village primary schools under the control of the Native Department. As part of the Government's policy to assimilate Māori into Pākehā society, instruction was to be conducted entirely in English where practical. Under the Act, it was the responsibility of Māori communities to request a school for their children, form a school committee, supply land for the school and, until 1871, pay for half of the building costs and a quarter of the teacher's salary. Despite this, many communities were keen for their children to learn English as a second language and by 1879 there were 57 Native Schools. In 1880 the first inspector of native schools was appointed and issued a Native Schools Code that prescribed a curriculum, established qualifications for teachers, and standardised operation for the Māori schools.

Church and missionary schools
The CMS founded its first mission at Rangihoua in the Bay of Islands in 1814 and over the next decade established schools in the Bay of Islands. The education of Māori children and adults was advanced with the arrival of the Revd. Henry Williams and his wife Marianne in 1823. In 1826 Henry's brother, the Revd. William, and his wife Jane joined the CMS mission and settled at Paihia in the Bay of Islands, where schools were established. Richard Taylor, was appointed as head of the CMS school at Te Waimate mission in 1839 and remained there until 1842.

Schools for Māori children and adults were established in locations where the CMS established mission stations. For example, the Revd. William Williams and his family arrived at Tūranga, Poverty Bay on 20 January 1840. The schools run by William and Jane Williams were well attended, the school opened with five classes for men, two classes for women and classes for boys. Classes covered practical knowledge as well as the teaching of the scriptures.

Until the 1860s, the government subsidised church schools for Māori. Early missionary schools were often conducted in the Māori language, which was the predominant language throughout the early part of the 19th century. By the 1860s, three-quarters of the Māori population could read in Māori and two-thirds could write in Māori. The Education Ordinance of 1847 provided funding for mission schools and required them to conduct classes in English in order to receive subsidies.

The New Zealand Wars forced the closure of many of the mission schools. However, Te Aute College and Hukarere Girls' College in Hawkes Bay, which were established by the CMS, were not impacted by the wars. Schools for Māori children that followed the Roman Catholic tradition, including Hato Paora College (Feilding); and St Joseph's Māori Girls' College (Taradale), were also not impacted by the wars.

Native schools
The Native Schools Act of 1867 was a major shift in policy. Rather than helping churches to rebuild mission schools after  the wars, the government offered secular, state-controlled, primary schools to Māori communities who petitioned for them. In return for providing a suitable site, the government provided a school, teacher, books, and materials. Native school teachers frequently also provided medicines and medical advice to their pupils and their families, and acted as liaison between rural communities and the government. 

James Pope (1837–1913) was appointed the organising inspector of native schools in January 1880 and he issued a Native Schools Code later in 1880 that prescribed a curriculum, established qualifications for teachers, and standardised operation for the native schools. The primary mission was to assimilate Māori into European culture. Māori could attend Board of Education schools and non-Māori could attend native schools, although the primary purpose of the native schools was providing European education for Māori. Throughout the 20th century the number of native schools decreased and Māori increasingly attended Board of Education schools.

The Act required that instruction be carried out in English where practicable. The Native Schools Code published in 1880 stated that "the Native children must be taught to read and write the English language, and to speak it" and alsoIt is not necessary that teachers should, at the time of their appointment, be acquainted with the Maori tongue; but they may find it desirable to learn enough Maori to enable them to communicate with the adult Natives. In all cases English is to be used by the teacher when he is instructing the senior classes. In the junior classes the Maori language may be used for the purpose of making the children acquainted with the meanings of English words and sentences. The aim of the teacher, however, should be to dispense with the use of Maori in school as soon as possible.

In 1906 the Inspector of Native Schools, William Bird, reported to the Inspector-General of Schools:I should like to impress upon both teachers and committees the necessity for encouraging the children to talk English on the playground, and to see that this is done as much as possible. There are many schools in which this habit is regularly practised, and it is very encouraging to hear the young Maori children calling to one another in English as they chase each other about the playground. I may inform teachers that it has been alleged that an important distinction exists in this very respect between the Maori children attending a Board school and those attending one of our own Native schools—namely, that the former speak English in the playground, while the latter speak Maori. I hope that teachers will do their best to give this statement a practical denial, and to take every care to impress upon the children the necessity of practising outside school the lessons they learn within it.Although children were to be encouraged to speak English, there was no official policy banning children from speaking Te Reo Māori. However some native school committees made rules banning this, and Māori children were sometimes physically punished for speaking their native tongue at school. This practice, which persisted for decades after the act was introduced in the mid 19th century, contributed to the massive decline in Te Reo Māori.

In the late 1800s, George Hogben, Director of Education, implemented the policy of removing academic subjects, such as Latin, Euclidian geometry  and algebra, which were subjects that were part of the matriculation programme for entry to a university, and focused the curriculum of native schools on agricultural and technical instruction and domestic skills. It was pointed out that there was nothing to stop a Māori from learning classics, maths and algebra (for example) at a regular public school. Regarding Te Aute College, there was a recommendation in 1906 that "having regard to the circumstances of the Māoris as owners of considerable areas of suitable agricultural and pastoral land, it is necessary to give prominence in the curriculum to manual and technical instruction in agriculture.  This view was supported by Māori politicians. William Bird, Inspector of Native Schools, expressed the opinion that the objective of Māori education should be to prepare pupils for life among Māori where they could take the skills they had learned to improve the lives of people in their home villages.

The native schools remained distinct from other New Zealand schools until 1969, when the last 108 native schools were transferred to the control of education boards.

See also
 History of education in New Zealand
 Native American boarding schools in the United States
 Residential schools in Canada
 Stolen Generations
 Cultural genocide

References

Further reading
 Barrington, John. Separate but equal?: Māori schools and the Crown, 1867–1969 (Wellington: Victoria University Press, 2008) 
 Simon, Judith, ed. The Native Schools System 1867–1969: Ngā Kura Māori (Auckland: Auckland University Press, 1998)

External links 
 
 Māori Education in New Zealand: A Historical Overview The Wananga Capital Establishment Report (Wananga Māori Education Funding claim) Wai 718 (22 Apr 1999) Chapter 2 of a Waitangi Tribunal Report

Cultural assimilation
Māori history
    
Māori language
History of education in New Zealand